Henry Vyfhuis (born 1 July 1876, date of death unknown) was a cricketer from British Guiana. He played in ten first-class matches for British Guiana from 1896 to 1911.

See also
 List of Guyanese representative cricketers

References

External links
 

1876 births
Year of death missing
Cricketers from British Guiana